The Minnesota Golden Gophers represent the University of Minnesota, Twin Cities in women's gymnastics. They are coached by Jenny Hansen.  The Gophers have 6 Big Ten Conference titles, most recently in 2021.  In 1990 Marie Roethlisberger won the NCAA Championship in uneven bars, the Gophers' only NCAA champion to date.

History

The Minnesota gymnastics program competed its first season in 1974 in AIAW competition, joining the NCAA for the 1983 season. Katalin Deli was hired as the first coach in 1973 and quickly established the team as a contender for regional and conference titles; she was named Big Ten Coach of the Year for the 1989 and 1991 seasons. During her tenure Minnesota won three Big Ten conference titles as a team and Minnesota gymnasts won 21 individual event titles. Deli was fired following the 1992 season after gymnasts accidentally saw a sex tape of Deli and her husband, then-assistant coach Gabor Deli.

Jim Stephenson took over the program in 1993 and added his wife Meg Stephenson as co-head coach in 1998. Under the Stephensons, Minnesota advanced to the NCAA National Championships three times, finishing 10th in 1997, 9th in 2002, and 8th in 2013. Minnesota also added more Big Ten team titles, winning in 1998 and 2006. Jim stepped down as head coach in 2010, continuing to assist the team in a volunteer position.

In 2014, Meg Stephenson resigned due to controversy over her siding with her husband in a sexual harassment allegation, and allegedly retaliating against the student who made the claims. Assistant coach Jenny Hansen served as interim head coach for the 2015 season, before being officially promoted to the position.

The highest score ever recorded by the Minnesota gymnastics team is 197.750, at the 2021 conference championships.

Roster

Head coach: Jenny Hansen
Assistant coach: Geralen Stack-Eaton
Assistant coach: Rich Stenger

See also

 Minnesota Golden Gophers men's gymnastics

References

External links
Official website